Captain Philippines at Boy Pinoy is a 1965 Filipino film produced by movie producer and actor Fernando Poe, Jr. through D'Lanor Productions. The film featuring Filipino superheroes Captain Philippines and Boy Pinoy was directed by Paquito Toledo.  The movie starred Filipino actors Bob Soler (the first actor who acted as Captain Barbell) as Captain Philippines and Lou Salvador, Jr. as Boy Pinoy. The motorcycle-riding Captain Philippines’ costume and shield showcased the "three stars and a sun" and the four colors (blue, red, white and yellow) of the Philippine flag.

Cast
Bob Soler as Captain Philippines
Lou Salvador Jr. as Boy Pinoy
Nova Villa		
Marion Douglas		
Nello Nayo		
Pablo Virtuoso		
Jose Garcia		
Mary Walter		
Angelo Ventura		
Resty Sandel		
Vic Uematsu		
Diego Guerrero		
Marilou Murray		
Leni Trinidad

See also
 Alyas Batman at Robin
 Alyas Batman en Robin

References

External links
 
Cartoon depiction of Captain Philippines and Boy Pinoy at Deviant Art.com

1965 films
Philippine fantasy action films
Tagalog-language films
Filipino superheroes